William Clark (February 18, 1774March 28, 1851) was a farmer, jurist, and politician from Dauphin, Pennsylvania.

Biography
He served as secretary of the Pennsylvania land office from 1818 to 1821, and State treasurer from 1821 to 1827. He was Treasurer of the United States from June 4, 1828 to November 1829.

Clark was elected as an Anti-Masonic candidate to the Twenty-third and Twenty-fourth Congresses. He was a member of the State constitutional revision commission in 1837. After Congress, he engaged in agricultural pursuits and died near Dauphin in 1851. He was interred in English Presbyterian Cemetery.

External links

 The Political Graveyard

References

1774 births
1851 deaths
People from Dauphin County, Pennsylvania
Anti-Masonic Party members of the United States House of Representatives from Pennsylvania
19th-century American politicians
Treasurers of the United States
Pennsylvania state court judges
People from Pennsylvania in the War of 1812